is a 1983 Japanese film in Nikkatsu's Roman porno series, directed by Masaru Konuma and starring Nami Matsukawa.

Synopsis
Sayo is running a travelling SM show with her husband, where she plays the bottom, and gets increasingly bored with her life. During their tour in Kyoto, they are arranged by a well-off couple who ask for a private show, without knowing that they will eventually be forced for the "real thing".

Cast
 Nami Matsukawa: Sayo Mayuzumi
 Ryōsei Tayama: Isao, Sayo's husband
 Kazuyuki Senba: Kenzo Kawamura
 Izumi Shima: Taeko, Kawamura's wife 
 Akira Takahashi: Strip club owner
 Izumi Sagawa: Girl at Kiyomizu-dera
 Yōichi Takabayashi: Man in kimono (with the girl)
 Saburō Shōji: Kawamura's contact

Critical appraisal 
In their Japanese Cinema Encyclopedia: The Sex Films, the Weissers write that with Rope and Breasts, director Konuma has taken the S&M theme—which he pioneered in Nikkatsu's 
with Afternoon Affair: Kyoto Holy Tapestry (1973)-- to the level of exploitation. In this film, they judge, nudity, bondage, and torture have taken place of a story. Rather than the interesting plotting found in some of Konuma's previous works, the film is a series of set-pieces. "The most salacious finds beautiful Nami Matsukawa floating in a large goldfish bowl as she empties her bowels for the leering crowd of old geezers."

As Jasper Sharp describes this scene, Matsukawa is given an enema, and then forced into the fishbowl. "She quivers for several moments as she is forced to hold it in, before violently releasing the viscous fluid into the waters, as the spectators stare on mesmerised in a mixture of curiosity and awe, like kids at a birthday party watching a clown conjuring up balloon animals." Sharp uses this scene to illustrate the nature of the softcore genre in Japan. Because of the censorship, we cannot be sure into which orifice the enema is inserted. "Though perverse," he writes, "this scene is not particularly explicit."

Availability
Rope and Breasts was released on DVD in Japan on February 23, 2006, as part of Geneon's fourth wave of Nikkatsu Roman porno series.

Bibliography

English

Japanese

Notes

1983 films
Films directed by Masaru Konuma
1980s Japanese-language films
Nikkatsu films
Nikkatsu Roman Porno
1980s Japanese films